Oil is any of a number of nonpolar, hydrophobic, and viscous liquids.

Oil also often refers to:

 Cooking oil, any liquid fat used in food preparation
 Lubricant, a substance that reduces friction between surfaces
 Lubrication,  using a lubricant to reduce friction
 Motor oil, any lubricant used in internal combustion engines
 Petroleum (crude oil), naturally occurring liquid found beneath the Earth's surface, or a derived product:
 Fuel oil, liquid fuel burned for heat or power
 Heating oil, liquid fuel

Arts, entertainment, and media

Art
 Oil paint, paint with pigments suspended in an oil
 Oil painting, the process of using paints based on oils

Music
 Oil (band), a group of Californian heavy metal musicians
 OiL, a band from Pennsylvania now called CKY
 Oil: Chicago Punk Refined, a compilation CD released by Thick Records
 Midnight Oil, also known as "The Oils", an Australian rock band

Television

Series
 Oil, an early title of the U.S. TV series Blood & Oil
 Oil, the original title of 1980s soap opera Dynasty

Episodes
 "Oil" (Dynasty), the debut episode of Dynasty
 "Oil" (The Young Ones), a 1982 episode of The Young Ones

Other arts, entertainment, and media
 Oil (film), a 2009 Italian documentary
 Oil!, a novel by Upton Sinclair published in 1927

Organizations
 Big Oil, a name used to collectively describe major oil corporations
 OIL (incorporations and corporate services), a company
 Office of Infrastructure and Logistics (European Commission) in Luxembourg
 Oil India Ltd
 Oil Insurance Limited, a mutual insurance company
 Oilexco (TSX: OIL, LON: OIL), an oil company

Technology
 Ontology Inference Layer or Ontology Interchange Language, an ontology infrastructure for the Semantic Web
 OSEK Implementation Language, a description language used in OSEK systems

See also

Langues d'oïl (in Romance languages)
OYL (disambiguation)